is a Japanese rugby union player who plays as a Lock. He currently plays for Green Rockets Tokatsu in Japan's domestic Top League. He was a candidate for the U20 Japan National Team, but he was not selected.

References

External Links
itsrugby.co.uk profile
Top League profile

1998 births
Living people
Japanese rugby union players
Rugby union locks
Green Rockets Tokatsu players